My May Film is a films production and distribution company in Hong Kong.

My Way was founded in 1981 by Jeffrey Kai-Ping Cheung and in 1991 changes the name to 'My Way Film Company Limited'. It started production of females themed action movies in large quantity, martial arts action films and children action films during the early 90's.

In 1983, it produced female themed action movie in the United States for Asia distribution during the Hong Kong Cinema promotion, the industry has over all media right to a library of about 200 movies.

The film company was founded by Jeremy Kai-ping Cheung, a veteran in the Hong Kong film industries for over 40 years in experience.

Donnie Yen who was the director and the scriptwriter of movie 'The New Big Boss' also starred as 'Fung Man-hin' in the movie.

Awards 
The company won, The Most Popular Film Award 1994 on the movie 'Panda The Sun' at Chicago International Children's Film Festival.

Films produced and distribute 
List of the films produced and directors:

References

Sources 

 IMDB ID
 Source Hong Kong Companies Registry,  (http://www.icris.cr.gov.hk/), 16 December 2019
 
 

Cinema of Hong Kong
1981 establishments in Hong Kong